On the morning of 14 August 2010, Richard Challen was killed by his wife Sally Challen in Claygate, Surrey, England. Sally, 56 at the time, beat the 61-year-old retired car dealer with a hammer 20 times, killing him, after he told her not to question him. She then covered the body and left a note that said, "I love you. Sally." The killing occurred in the kitchen of the couple's marital home. On the following day, Sally travelled to Beachy Head, intending to kill herself.

At Guildford Crown Court in Surrey in June 2011, she was convicted of his murder after a seven-day trial, for which she was jailed for life. Coercive control became a criminal offence in 2015. In February 2019 at the Court of Appeal in London, her conviction was quashed and a retrial ordered in light of her having adjustment disorder at the time she killed her husband. Her appeal was based partly on her undiagnosed mental health conditions; she had been treated for bipolar disorder, dependent personality disorder and adjustment disorder while in prison. Sally admitted manslaughter on the grounds of diminished responsibility and pleaded not guilty to murder. She was due to be retried on 1 July 2019. However, on 7 June 2019 at the Old Bailey in London, her plea was accepted and the retrial cancelled. The judge said that Challen controlled, isolated and humiliated his wife and was frequently unfaithful to her. He sentenced her to nine years and four months' imprisonment, which she had already served. Sally's son David supported her and fought for her in the media; he felt the murder could have been prevented.

Challen and Sally met several years before they married in 1979; the couple had two sons.

In May 2020, Judge Paul Matthews, sitting in the High Court in Bristol, ruled that Sally could inherit the estate of the deceased Challen, which is valued at £1 million. The claim was made to help benefit Sally's children.

References

2010 crimes in the United Kingdom
2010s in Surrey
2010s trials
August 2010 crimes
August 2010 events in the United Kingdom
Borough of Elmbridge
Crime in Surrey
Deaths by person in England
Manslaughter in England
Murder trials
Overturned convictions in England
Trials in England
Hammer assaults